Landtag elections in the Free State of Lippe (Freistaat Lippe) during the Weimar Republic were held at irregular intervals between 1919 and 1933. Results with regard to the total vote, the percentage of the vote won and the number of seats allocated to each party are presented in the tables below. On 31 March 1933, the sitting Landtag was dissolved by the Nazi-controlled central government and reconstituted to reflect the distribution of seats in the national Reichstag. The Landtag subsequently was formally abolished as a result of the "Law on the Reconstruction of the Reich" of 30 January 1934 which replaced the German federal system with a unitary state.

1919
The 1919 Lippe state election was held on 26 January 1919 to elect the 21 members of the Landtag.

1921
The 1921 Lippe state election was held on 23 January 1921 to elect the 20 members of the Landtag.

1925
The 1925 Lippe state election was held on 18 January 1925 to elect the 21 members of the Landtag.

1929
The 1929 Lippe state election was held on 6 January 1929 to elect the 21 members of the Landtag.

1933
The 1933 Lippe state election was held on 15 January 1933 to elect the 21 members of the Landtag.

References

Elections in the Weimar Republic
Elections in North Rhine-Westphalia
Lippe
Lippe
Lippe
Lippe
Lippe